Shindō, Shindo or Shindou (written: , ,) is a Japanese surname. Notable people with the surname include:

, Japanese voice actress and singer
Charles J. Shindo, American academic
, Japanese actor
, Japanese actor and singer
, Japanese film director, producer, screenwriter and writer
, Japanese voice actress
, Japanese art director and film director
, Japanese voice actress
Tak Shindo (1922–2002), Japanese-American musician
Yoko Shindo (真道 洋子, 19602018), Japanese archaeologist
, Japanese politician
, Japanese musician, guitarist, composer and lyricist

Fictional characters 

 Several characters in Hikaru no Go
 Risa Shindō of Battle Royale II: Requiem
 Shūichi Shindō of Gravitation
 Ranmaru and Saya Shindo of Tokko (manga)
 Mie Shindou, a fictional character from Strike Witches
 Nadeshiko Shindo, one of the minor characters from the anime and manga series Vampire Knight
 Mikaela Shindo, the former name of Mikaela Hyakuya, from the anime and manga series Seraph of the End/Owari no Seraph 
 Erina Shindō, from the anime and manga series Gonna be the Twin-Tail!!
 Chrono Shindou, Mikuru Shindou and Rive Shindou, from the anime and manga Cardfight!! Vanguard G

Japanese-language surnames